Koulassi is a village in the Bassar Prefecture in the Kara Region  of north-western Togo. It is estimated to be 252 metres above sea level and is a highly populated place.

References

Populated places in Kara Region
Bassar Prefecture